Unique Recording Studios was a five-room recording studio operating near Times Square in New York City from 1978 until 2004. Founders and co-owners Bobby Nathan and Joanne Georgio-Nathan installed the first Otari 24-track tape deck in New York. The studio was known for its extensive collection of synthesizers, which attracted Steve Winwood, who jammed for many hours in the process of creating his multi-Grammy winning album Back in the High Life (1986) at Unique.

Founders
Bobby Nathan was born in New York, and learned to play guitar at age 11. In 1965 in his late teens, he played clubs on the Jersey Shore with his band the Pipers. In September 1973, Bobby met Joanne Georgio and they formed a band called Uptown, playing the Tri-State area, shifting to steady gigs in New York City. Georgio and Nathan married. In 1976 Uptown broke up and the Nathans formed another band called Strawberry, playing disco clubs, and backing disco singers such as Gloria Gaynor. In 1977 Strawberry became a trio with a drummer supporting Joanne and Bobby both on keyboards. In 1978 while playing at Disco Sally's on 55th and Seventh Ave, the Nathans asked former Gaynor guitarist John Fetter to join the band, and Strawberry was renamed Unique "The Disco Experience".  It was during these touring years that the Nathans began hauling around a larger-than-usual number of synthesizers for both to play, which would become a signature attraction of Unique Recording Studios.

Studio history

Unique Recording Studios started as a one-room rehearsal studio with a Tascam 8-track recorder in 1978, catering to new wave and hip hop artists. Early customers included Polyrock and Bill Laswell. In May 1980, the facility quickly expanded to 16 tracks and a 28 Input Sound Workshop series 30 console. In September 1980, Ian McDonald co-founder of Foreigner came to Unique to record a 16 track solo project. By November 1980, McDonald ran out of tracks and became the catalyst for the studios jump to 24 tracks with the first Otari MTR-90 tape recorder. In 1981 the facility upgraded with a 36 input MCI JH-600 series mixer with automation and Tommy Boy Records began asking for lengthy bookings to accommodate their artists, especially Planet Patrol. Planet Patrol's Arthur Baker also started to produce other artists, and his bookings eventually required a second room. Into this larger space Baker brought New Edition, which recorded Candy Girl at Unique during 1982, with Baker and Maurice Starr co-producing. Candy Girl reached number 90 on the Billboard 200, staying on the chart for 33 weeks.

The studio complex was located in Manhattan just off of Times Square in the top three floors of the Cecil B. DeMille Building, adjacent to music-store row.  The business was owned and operated by husband and wife team Joanne and Bobby Nathan. The Nathans described themselves as "the pioneers in drum machines, samplers and digital recording on personal computers.

Unique Recording Studios is credited for opening the first MIDI recording room in 1983 called "Midi City" which was later named Studio C, located upstairs from Studio A. The studio could hold 30 synthesizers, with room left over for sequencers and interfaces. Wall jacks made wiring easier and neater. The innovative concept gained Unique a nomination for the 1985 TEC Awards in the recording studio category.

The studio was well known for its large collection of synthesizers and drum machines. Unique was one of the first studios to own a Polymoog synth, as well as the Minimoog, the ARP 2600, the Oberheim OB-X and 8-voice, and a Prophet 5. When Steve Winwood showed up in 1985 to get further inspiration for his project Back in the High Life, he booked all-nighters at Unique and played every synth, jamming with any other studio clients who were willing to join. Back in the High Life was recorded largely at Unique by Tom Lord-Alge with assistance from his brother Chris; Tom remembers taking an impromptu drum break played between songs by drummer John Robinson, and moving it to the beginning of "Higher Love", which satisfied producer Russ Titelman as the album opener. Titelman recalls that Winwood had been recording the album for a year at other studios but had reached a point where he needed more inspiration. Titelman brought the project to Unique for the variety of MIDI-connected synthesizers and for the familiar mixer – a Solid State Logic SL 4000E identical to the one at Winwood's home studio. Titelman obtained a huge drum sound by recording Robinson's drum kit in the center of Unique's main studio, surrounded by eight extra ambient microphones. The song "Higher Love" won a Grammy Award for the best single record of 1987, and the album won a Grammy for the best engineered album, honoring Tom's mix: his first time as head engineer. Chris recalled that the Lord-Alge brothers' status at Unique was raised after the success of the album: "Even though I'd had hits [before Unique], Bobby and Joanne Nathan insisted that I start out as an assistant, and they worked me really hard. But once Back in the High Life hit, it made it a lot easier for Tommy and me to do no wrong at Unique."

In early 1986 before Back in the High Life was released, Unique reported to Billboard that they had renovated their main studio with a larger control room so that more outboard processing gear and MIDI synthesizer modules could be placed next to the SSL 4000E 48-channel mixer with Total Recall automation. Recording units included two linked Otari MTR-90 Mk II decks each with 24 tracks, and one Studer A-80 half-inch 2-track for stereo mastering. Video decks were installed to feed a video projector so that audio-for-television projects could be accommodated. The studio also owned a 32-channel Neve 8068 mixer that had been in Electric Lady Studios. Unique was nominated a second time for a TEC Award in 1987.

Unique kept pace with technology developments by adding Pro Tools digital audio workstation (DAW) rigs to their studios, connected to 24-channel interfaces made by Digidesign and Focusrite. A total of five DAWs were installed by 1998.

After 2001, all of the music industry in New York City was in a slowdown. The vintage Neve console was removed from Studio D in 2002 for sale to Glenwood Place, a new studio fitting out in Burbank, California. Nathan said that a vintage Neve in the tracking room was more of a trend in California. Studio D continued as a Pro Tools rig with Neve and API preamps. In 2003, Unique introduced a suite of plugins for Pro Tools, called Unique Recording Software (URS). The plugins offered emulation of classic analog equalizers. Through the URS plugin package, Unique picked up a third nomination for a TEC Award in the Software and Signal Processing category in 2004. However, this industry honor was not enough to keep the business afloat, and Unique was shuttered in June 2004. Major clients were no longer renting time on a Pro Tools rig, they were instead buying one for the artist's home studio.

The URS plugin products continued to be developed and sold after Unique closed. In 2008, a plugin named Classic Console Strip Pro was nominated for a TEC Award.

Notable recording and mixing projects

Grammy, AMA, MTV Awards 
Grammy Awards earned by artists for projects that passed through Unique.

References

External links

1978 establishments in New York City
Companies based in New York City
Privately held companies based in New York (state)
Recording studios in Manhattan
Times Square